A Beautiful Mind may refer to:

 A Beautiful Mind (book), about the life of John Forbes Nash, Jr.
 A Beautiful Mind (film), the 2001 film adaptation of the same title
 A Beautiful Mind (soundtrack), the associated soundtrack album
 A Beautiful Mind (TV series), Korean series starring Jang Hyuk and Park So-dam
 Beautiful Mind (album), a 2022 album by Rod Wave

See also
 Beautiful Young Minds, a documentary following a British team of mathematical competitors (on 2006 International Mathematical Olympiad)
 Beautiful Minds (disambiguation)